Chembary is a rural locality (a selo) in Chernovsky Selsoviet of Svobodnensky District, Amur Oblast, Russia. The population was 366 as of 2018. There are 7 streets.

Geography 
Chembary is located on the left bank of the Bolshaya Pyora River, 38 km north of Svobodny (the district's administrative centre) by road. Chernovka is the nearest rural locality.

References 

Rural localities in Svobodnensky District